Floella Karen Yunies Benjamin, Baroness Benjamin,  (born 23 September 1949) is a Trinidadian-British actress, singer, presenter, author, businesswoman, and politician. She is known as presenter of children's programmes such as Play School, Play Away, Jamboree and Fast Forward. On 28 June 2010, Lady Benjamin was introduced to the House of Lords as a life peer nominated by the Liberal Democrats.

Early life
Benjamin was born on 23 September 1949 in Pointe-à-Pierre, Trinidad and Tobago, one of six siblings, with one older sister, three younger brother and a younger sister.

When her father, "a policeman and a talented jazz musician", decided to emigrate to Britain, with her mother later joining him along with Benjamin’s younger sister and youngest brother, the four older children were left in the care of family friends, with Benjamin and her older sister, Sandra, being separated from their brothers. The people looking after Benjamin and her sister were secretly abusive. Benjamin and her sister often tried writing to their parents to tell them about the abuse, but the letters were always read and censored before they were sent. In 1960 the children went to join him in Beckenham, Kent. She has discussed the racist experiences she had when arriving in Britain as an immigrant, such as with neighbours and at school.

Having left school to work in a bank, she studied for A-Levels at night school. After a spell as a stage actress in West End musicals, she began presenting children's television programmes in 1976, notably Play School for BBC.

Entertainment
Benjamin has appeared in Hair, Jesus Christ Superstar, The Black Mikado and The Husband-In-Law, as well as several pantomimes. On screen, she appeared in the 1975 horror film I Don't Want to Be Born and starred in the 1977 film Black Joy. Her television credits include Angels, Within These Walls, Crown Court, The Gentle Touch and Dixon of Dock Green. She appeared as Juniper in the first episode of Bergerac (1981).

Benjamin read two stories for the Story Teller magazine series (1983 and 1984). She was chief executive of Floella Benjamin Productions Ltd, which had produced television programmes since 1987 and was dissolved in 2014. She had done the voice work of "U" and "PG" Video Standards Council information clips. In 2006, she appeared in an episode of The Line of Beauty.

Between 2007 and 2011, she guest-starred in the Doctor Who spin-off The Sarah Jane Adventures as Professor Rivers of the Pharos Institute in the stories The Lost Boy, The Day of the Clown, The Eternity Trap, and Sky. She also narrated three "making-of" documentaries on the Doctor Who DVD boxed set The Black Guardian Trilogy. In 2007, she played a small role in the British comedy Run Fatboy Run.

She sings with Damn Right I Got The Blues, a rock and blues band, and has said, "When I sing I am in my element."

Publications
Benjamin's 20th book, a memoir, Coming to England, about moving from Trinidad, was published in 1997, and is now used to teach modern history to young people. It was made into a television film by CBBC in 2005.

Other books written by Floella and published by various houses include titles such as Floella's Fun Book, Why the Agouti Has No Tail, Caribbean Cookery and Snotty and the Rod of Power.  Many of her titles are aimed at children and development.

Honours and offices

Benjamin was appointed Officer of the Order of the British Empire (OBE) in the 2001 New Year Honours for services to broadcasting. At that time she was chairperson of the British Academy of Film and Television Arts (BAFTA). She has also won a Special Lifetime Achievement award from BAFTA. She was chairperson of the Women of the Year Lunch for five years and a Millennium Commissioner. She is president of the Elizabeth R Commonwealth Broadcasting Fund and a governor of the National Film and Television School. She was a governor of Dulwich College, where her mother once worked and her son had attended.

In 2006, she was awarded the degree of honorary D.Litt. (Exon) by the University of Exeter for contributions to the life of the United Kingdom.  Benjamin succeeded Lord Alexander of Weedon as Chancellor of the University of Exeter. She famously hugged graduates instead of traditionally shaking their hands during the graduation ceremonies. Benjamin stepped down from office in winter 2016 after ten years in the post. 

A statue of Benjamin is outside the University's student guild.(shown on the right) The plaque reads Consideration ~ put yourself in the place of others and show empathy and respect. Never be judgmental.; Contentment ~ Don't be jealous and envious, but be satisfied with what you have. That way you are open and ready to receive what is right for you.; Confidence ~ Be a decent human being, feel worthy and like the person you are. Give and love unconditionally and more will come back to you. This was the first public statue of a named black woman in the UK. 

In 2008, she was appointed a Deputy lieutenant of Greater London. In the 2010 Dissolution Honours List, she was appointed a Liberal Democrat life peer, being created Baroness Benjamin, of Beckenham in the London Borough of Bromley on 26 June 2010. She was the first actress to become a peer in the House of Lords. In her maiden speech, she spoke of choosing Beckenham to reflect the legacy of her mother and father, and the importance of childhood. She referenced her support of such charities as NSPCC, Childline, and Barnados, and their work to protect and support the health and wellbeing of vulnerable children.

In the 2020 Powerlist, Benjamin was listed in the Top 100 of the most influential people in the UK of African/African-Caribbean descent in the UK. The same year saw Benjamin appointed Dame Commander of the Order of the British Empire (DBE) in the 2020 New Year Honours for services to charity. On 12 March 2020, in an Investiture ceremony at Buckingham Palace, she received the award from Prince Charles. In 2022 she was awarded the honorary degree of Doctor of Letters (D.Litt) by the University of Chester. She was made a member of the Order of Merit in 2022.

Educational and charitable interests

Benjamin's interest in education has also seen her on the "4Rs Commission" established by the Liberal Democrats to look into primary education in the UK.

Benjamin is vice-president of NCH Action for Children and Barnardo's, and was in the NSPCC's Hall of Fame. She runs the London Marathon to raise funds for Barnardo's and the Sickle Cell Society. She was a cultural ambassador for the 2012 Summer Olympics. In September 2011, she participated in the Great North Run. She features in the BBCs CBeebies animation Mama Mirabelle's Home Movies.

In July 2007 she spoke of what she saw as the low standard of children's television and in March 2013, she used a speech marking International Women's Day to warn of the impact on children of the availability of violent pornographic material online, saying that this was leading to the increasing objectification of women.

Benjamin is a patron of the charity Beating Bowel Cancer, having lost her mother to the disease in 2009.

In October 2015 in a talk to migrant children, Floella Benjamin said that dropping her accent was the key to her success and that migrant pupils should do the same to avoid racism and bullying.

In June 2022, as chair of the Windrush Commemoration Committee, she unveiled a statue in Waterloo Station by the sculptor Basil Watson as the National Windrush Monument in the presence of the Duke of Cambridge.

Filmography

Film

Television

References

External links
 Floella Benjamin at the British Film Institute
 Floella Benjamin profile , TV.Com; accessed 25 March 2014. 
 
 Floella Benjamin official website
 University of Exeter webpage

1949 births
Living people
20th-century British actresses
21st-century British actresses
2012 Summer Olympics cultural ambassadors
Actresses awarded damehoods
Actresses awarded British peerages
Actresses from London
BBC television presenters
Black British actresses
Black British television personalities
Black British women politicians
Black British women writers
British film actresses
British stage actresses
British television actresses
British television presenters
British television producers
British women television presenters
Chancellors of the University of Exeter
Dames Commander of the Order of the British Empire
Deputy Lieutenants of Greater London
English people of Trinidad and Tobago descent
Liberal Democrats (UK) life peers
Life peeresses created by Elizabeth II
Members of the Order of Merit
People from Beckenham
Trinidad and Tobago emigrants to the United Kingdom
British women television producers
British women memoirists
20th-century memoirists